Alan Nicholas Jacobsen (18 August 1916 – 10 October 1995) was an Australian rules footballer who played for the Footscray Football Club in the Victorian Football League (VFL).

Notes

External links 
		

1916 births
1995 deaths
Australian rules footballers from Melbourne
Western Bulldogs players
People from Footscray, Victoria